Go Home is a 1970 album by the Art Ensemble of Chicago recorded in Paris for the French Galloway label - first released in 1973. It features performances by Lester Bowie, Joseph Jarman, Roscoe Mitchell and Malachi Favors Maghostut along with Fontella Bass, Ivan Julien, Bernard Vitet, Ambrose Jackson, Jean Louis Chautemps, Alain Matot, Ventosa, Kenneth Terroade, Raymond Katarzinsky and several unidentified musicians.

Reception

The AllMusic review of the CD reissue combining the album with Chi-Congo stated "Go Home is an adventurous (even for this group), 1970 session that encompasses droning, atmospheric introductions and interludes, rollicking old-timey swing, splattery avant-garde honk-and-clatter that includes an extended interlude of what sounds like junkyard percussion, a quite beautiful and atmospheric piece including vocals by AEOC trumpeter Lester Bowie's wife, Fontella Bass, and the side-long, Stravinsky-esque "Dance," which features eight additional horn players and a string section. Crisply recorded, it's a showcase for many facets of the Art Ensemble's music, and a major work in their discography".

Track listing
All compositions by the Art Ensemble of Chicago
 "Hello Chi" - 2:54
 "From Bengali" - 3:51
 "From St.Louis" - 2:30
 "Fly With Honey Bee" - 6:23
 "Hello Chi" - 2:38
 "Dance" - 15:22
Recorded March & April, 1970 at Studio Ossian, Paris

Personnel
Lester Bowie: trumpet
Ivan Jullien: trumpet
Bernard Vitet: trumpet
Ambrose Jackson: trumpet
Roscoe Mitchell: alto saxophone, flute
Joseph Jarman: alto saxophone, flute
Jean-Louis Chautemps: tenor saxophone
Alain Matot: alto saxophone
Ventosa: alto saxophone
Kenneth Terroade: tenor saxophone
Raymond Katarzinsky: trombone
Malachi Favors: bass
Fontella Bass: vocal

References

1970 albums
Art Ensemble of Chicago albums